King Lake may refer to:

King Lake (Itasca County, Minnesota), a lake
King Lake (Meeker County, Minnesota)
King Lake, Nebraska, a census-designated place in Douglas County
King Lake (Nova Scotia), a lake of Hants County

See also
Kings Lake (disambiguation)